On August 12, the Canadian Women's Hockey League hosted the 2010 CWHL Draft. The event was held at the Hockey Hall of Fame in Toronto at 7:00pm. The first overall selection was former Ohio State hockey player and Olympic gold medallist Tessa Bonhomme. Former Olympic gold medallist Cheryl Pounder was Master of Ceremonies at the draft.

Rules
All five teams were allowed to protect five players who had played at least one year in the league. Only players from the Greater Toronto Area were available in the draft for teams from Toronto, Burlington and Brampton. Boston and Montreal did not draft players. These clubs will sign prospective players from their geographic areas.

Draft by team

Brampton

Protected players

Burlington

Protected players

Toronto

Protected players

Montreal

Protected players

Boston
The Boston club was able to protect some players from being selected from their roster in the draft.

Protected players

References

Draft
Canadian Women's Hockey League